Etel L. Solingen (born 1952) is an American educator, writer, and former president of the International Studies Association (ISA) between the years of 2012 and 2013. She works at the University of California, Irvine, where she serves as the Thomas and Elizabeth Tierney Chair in Peace Studies.

In 2008 Solingen won a Woodrow Wilson Foundation Award for her book Nuclear Logics: Contrasting Paths in East Asia and the Middle East. She was awarded the 2018 William and Katherine Estes Award from the National Academy of Sciences.

Bibliography
Scientists and the State: Domestic Structures and the International Context (1994, as editor) 
Industrial Policy, Technology and International Bargaining: Designing Nuclear Industries in Argentina and Brazil (1996) 
Regional Orders at Century's Dawn: Global and Domestic Influences on Grand Strategy (1998) 
Nuclear Logics: Contrasting Paths in East Asia and the Middle East (2007)
Comparative Regionalism: Economics and Security (2013)
  Geopolitics, Supply Chains, and International Relations in East Asia  (edited) (2021)

References

External links
 

American international relations scholars
University of California, Irvine faculty
American women political scientists
American political scientists
Political liberals (international relations)
Political science writers
American non-fiction writers
Argentine emigrants to the United States
Women political writers
1952 births
Living people
21st-century American women